The Saydel Community School District is a rural public school district with its headquarters in unincorporated Polk County, Iowa.

The district, entirely in Polk County, serves portions of Des Moines and Ankeny. It also serves a portion of the Saylorville census-designated place.

Within the district are three schools: one elementary school, a middle school, and one high school.  District offices are located next to Woodside Middle School.

Schools
 Cornell Elementary
 Woodside Middle School
 Saydel High School

It previously operated Norwoodville Elementary School.

Saydel High School

Athletics
The Eagles compete in the Heart of Iowa Conference in the following sports:

Cross Country 
 Boys' 1957 Class B State Champions
Volleyball
Football
Basketball 
Wrestling
Track and Field
Soccer 
Golf 
Tennis 
Baseball 
Softball

See also
List of school districts in Iowa
List of high schools in Iowa

References

External links
 Saydel Community School District

School districts in Iowa
Education in Des Moines, Iowa
Ankeny, Iowa
Education in Polk County, Iowa